Knob Creek is a stream in Iron and St. Francois counties in the U.S. state of Missouri. It is a tributary of Stouts Creek.

The stream headwaters arise on the west flank of Oak Mountain at an elevation of 1400 feet. The stream flows west-southwest to enter the adjacent valley near Lopez about one mile south of Middlebrook in the southwest corner of St. Francois County. The stream enters Iron County and turns south-southeast and flows past Pilot 
Knob and Ironton to its confluence with Stouts Creek.

Knob Creek was named for a summit along its course called Pilot Knob.

See also
List of rivers of Missouri

References

Rivers of Iron County, Missouri
Rivers of St. Francois County, Missouri
Rivers of Missouri